The New Caledonia national futsal team is the representative team for New Caledonia in international futsal competitions. It is controlled by the Fédération Calédonienne de Football.

Tournament records

FIFA Futsal World Cup record

Oceanian Futsal Championship record

References

New Caledonia
F
Futsal in New Caledonia